Béla Hamvas (23 March 1897 – 7 November 1968) was a Hungarian writer, philosopher, and social critic. He was the first thinker to introduce the Traditionalist School of René Guénon to Hungary.

Biography
Béla Hamvas was born on 23 March 1897 in Eperjes, Sáros County, Kingdom of Hungary (present-day Prešov, Slovakia). His father, József Hamvas was a Lutheran pastor, teacher of German and Hungarian, journalist and writer. The family moved to Pozsony (Bratislava) in 1898, where Hamvas completed his basic studies in 1915. After graduation, like his classmates, he entered voluntary military service and was sent to the front in Ukraine. He was sent back to Budapest for hospital treatment due to severe traumatic shock, but just after recovery, he was drafted to the front line in western Italy. He never reached the battlefield, as his train was hit by a shell, and the wounded Hamvas was discharged.
 
In 1919 his father refused an oath of allegiance to the new nation of Czechoslovakia, whereupon his family was expelled from Bratislava. They moved to Budapest, where Hamvas attended Péter Pázmány Catholic University. After graduation he became a journalist at the newspapers Budapesti Hírlap and Szózat. Hamvas considered this job shallow and menial, but he had to support his family (although his father received a pension from 1924). Three years later he quit, as he had found a better job in the main library of Budapest. He was appointed as a senior librarian in 1927. By this time he was writing articles, reviews and essays for 25 different journals. He married Ilona Angyal in 1929, but divorced in 1936 to marry Katalin Kemény in 1937. She was his partner in founding the Sziget circle, a literary group which later gained prominent members like Antal Szerb, Károly Kerényi, László Németh, or Antal Molnár.

Nearly 20 years of library work was ended by World War II. Hamvas was drafted for military service three times. He continued his literary work while on the front lines - translating Laozi and Heraclitus among others. His first essay collection was published in 1943.

The couple survived the siege of Budapest. Their apartment was hit by bombing, destroying his library and manuscripts. Despite the Soviet siege and repeated harassment by the authorities, 1945 to 1947 were his most fruitful years.

In 1948 he was placed on the b-list (banned from publishing) by the Soviet installed socialist government, and was forced into retirement from his library job. Although he had published more than 250 works before his ban, most of Hamvas's body of work was written anonymously later on. He got a licence to farm in the garden of his brother-in-law in Szentendre, and tended plants there between 1948 and 1951, during which time he also completed Karnevál, one of his major essays.

Between 1951 and 1964 he was employed as an unskilled worker in power plants in Tiszapalkonya, Inota and Bokod, under harsh conditions. Whenever he had spare time he translated from Sanskrit, Hebrew and Greek, and wrote about the Cabala, Zen, and Sufism. Between 1959 and 1966 he completed Patmosz, his last major work.

Aged 67, he finally received a pension. Béla Hamvas died of a hemorrhagic stroke in 1968. He is buried in Szentendre.

In 1990 he posthumously received the Kossuth Prize.

Literature

He was a great thinker and essayist who integrated Eastern and Western traditions as well as posing many serious questions about the modern age, together with the possibility of resolving them. According to one of his central thoughts: "The present eon, since 600 B.C. stands in the sign of personal salvation. Only since this time is there a notion of humanity, because there is only one single collective category of personality and this is humanity."

Béla Hamvas found his form of expression in the essay, a genre at once literary and philosophical. His early essays were published in Magyar Hüperion (1936, Hungarian Hyperion), marking the end of his first period of thinking, to be followed by Szellem és egzisztencia (1941, Spirit and Existence), an essay discussing the philosophy of Karl Jaspers, one of the main inspirations for Hamvas’ thinking. He published a selection of essays on literature, psychology, philosophy and cultural history in A láthatatlan történet (1943, The Invisible Story). Analyzing the spiritual crisis of the age, Hamvas read himself into the metaphysical tradition, the collective spiritual knowledge of humanity conveyed by sacred books. His collection Scientia Sacra (the first six volumes, 1942–43) served to direct the attention of the age towards the philosophy of the Far East (The Upanishads, Tao Te King, The Tibetan Book of the Dead and others) and European mysticism. From 1945 Hamvas belonged to the spiritual renaissance for three years, during which time he edited the series Leaflets of the University Press, held lectures and published the metaphysical Anthologia humana: Ötezer év bölcsessége (1946, Human Anthology – The Wisdom of Five Millennia), the fourth edition of which was banned and pulped by the socialist regime. His essays written together with his wife on the history of art Forradalom a művészetben: Absztrakció és szürrealizmus Magyarországon (1947, Revolution in Art: Abstraction and Surrealism in Hungary) survey Hungarian art from Károly Ferenczy, Tivadar Csontváry Kosztka and Lajos Gulácsy up to the activity of the “European School”. Hamvas saw in surrealism and abstract art the heritage of magic, the “tremendous presence of a higher existence”, and opposed “realistic” art. This concept of modern art was attacked by the Marxist ideologist, György Lukács, and Hamvas was dismissed from the library and silenced for the rest of his life. His writings were published in samizdat.

His essays are grounded in tradition, their sense of humour is granted by knowledge, and humour, in turn, grants their freedom. Unicornis, Titkos Jegyzőkönyv, Silentium (1948–51, Unicorn, Secret Protocol, Silence) were published as late as 1987, but were written alongside Hamvas's great novel, Karnevál (1948–51, Carnival, published in 1985). This Magnum Opus, also called a “catalogue of fate”, a “human comedy”, spans continents and ages, Heaven and Hell. Hamvas’ three shorter novels, Szilveszter (1957, New Year’s Eve), Bizonyos tekintetben (1961, From a Certain Aspect) and Ugyanis (1966–67, Therefore) were published together in 1991, followed by his collection of essays, Patmosz (1959–1966; Patmos) in 1992, whose title alludes to John the Apostle’s exile to the island of Patmos, and the second part of Scientia Sacra: az őskori emberiség szellemi hagyománya II. rész: A kereszténység (1960–64, Sacred Science – Spiritual Heritage of Mankind, part II. Christianity) published in 1988.

Quotes about Hamvas

See also 
 György Bulányi

External links 
Medio Publishing LTD. - The Philosophy of Wine
Hamvas Bela Fondation, Budapest
Ars et Vita Foundation, Budapest
Hamvas Béla: On Friendship
Hamvas Béla: The Seventh Symphony and the Metaphysics of Music
Excerpts from Hamvas Béla's works in English
Biography and photos of Hamvas Béla at HamvasBéla.org

1897 births
1968 deaths
People from Prešov
Hungarian Lutherans
Hungarian writers
Austro-Hungarian military personnel of World War I
Traditionalist School
Pázmány Péter Catholic University alumni
20th-century Hungarian philosophers
20th-century Lutherans
Hungarian military personnel of World War II